Kamala Bahuguna (30 December 1923 – 7 November 2001) was an Indian politician. She was elected to the Lok Sabha, lower house of the Parliament of India from Phulpur, Uttar Pradesh as member of the Janata Party in 1977.

She is 2nd wife of Hemvati Nandan Bahuguna and lived with him in Allahabad and was mother of their 3 children:

 Their first son Vijay Bahuguna was the Chief Minister of Uttarakhand. He was a former judge of Allahabad High Court and Bombay High Court. Currently he is member of Bharatiya Janata Party
 Second son Shekhar Bahuguna.
 Daughter Rita Bahuguna Joshi is also in politics and was UP Congress Chief. She was also Mayor of Allahabad. Currently she is member of Bharatiya Janata Party and former minister in Yogi cabinet.

References

External links
 Official biographical sketch in Parliament of India website

1923 births
2001 deaths
India MPs 1977–1979
Lok Sabha members from Uttar Pradesh
Janata Party politicians
Bharatiya Lok Dal politicians
People from Allahabad
Indian National Congress politicians from Uttar Pradesh